Satyadeo Prasad Singh is an Indian Politician. He has been MLA from Bihar for twice terms from Goreyakothi in 2015 and from Basantpur in 2000. He is contesting Bihar Assembly Elections from 1985.

Early life
Satyadeo Prasad Singh was born in Village Kauriya of District Siwan,Bihar. His father Shivpujan Singh was a Teacher.

Political Carrier
Satyadeo Prasad Singh contested first time in 1985 from Basantpur Constituency of Siwan on ticket of BJP. He lost with a very less margin. He again contested in 1990 but again lost by very less margin. He was not demoralised and again contested in 1995 but again he lost. He was fully focused and again contested in 2000 and he won. His political carrier was very tough because he was not from a political background. He again continuously lost both elections in 2005. In 2010 BJP denied him ticket and he contested as an independent candidate from Goreyakothi and secured 10000 votes but lost the election. In 2015 he got the ticket of RJD and he won by defeating the candidate of BJP. In 2020 RJD denied him ticket and he contested as a candidate of RLSP but he lost and the candidate of BJP won.

2000 elections
Satyadeo Prasad Singh of BJP defeated Manik Chandra Roy of RJD by 3000 votes in the 2000 assembly elections.

2015 elections
Satyadeo Prasad Singh of RJD defeated Devesh Kaant Singh of BJP by 7,000 votes in the 2015 assembly election. Siwan.

References

Living people
1962 births